Käina Parish was a rural municipality of Hiiu County, Estonia on the southeastern part of the island.

Settlements
There was 1 small borough Käina and 34 villages:
Aadma, Allika, Esiküla, Jõeküla, Kaasiku, Kaigutsi, Kassari, Kleemu, Kogri, Kolga, Kuriste, Laheküla, Lelu, Ligema, Luguse, Mäeküla, Mäeltse, Männamaa, Moka, Nasva, Niidiküla, Nõmme, Nõmmerga, Orjaku, Pärnselja, Putkaste, Ristivälja, Selja, Taguküla, Taterma, Ühtri, Utu, Vaemla, Villemi.

References

Former municipalities of Estonia